is a railway station on the Semmō Main Line of Hokkaido Railway Company (JR Hokkaido) located in Shibecha, Hokkaidō, Japan.

The station opened on September 15, 1927.

Lines
Hokkaido Railway Company
Senmō Main Line Station B58

Adjacent stations

External links
 JR Hokkaido Tōro Station information

References 
 

Railway stations in Hokkaido Prefecture
Railway stations in Japan opened in 1927